David Addison Noble (November 9, 1802 – October 13, 1876) was a politician and judge from the U.S. state of Michigan who served a term in Congress from 1853 to 1855.

Noble was born in Williamstown, Massachusetts. He attended a private school in Plainfield and graduated from Williams College in Williamstown in 1825.  He studied law in Albany and New York City and was admitted to the bar in 1831.   That same year he commenced practice in New York City and then moved to Monroe, Michigan, continuing the practice of law.  

In Monroe, Noble served as city recorder in 1838, 1839, and 1844–1850, as mayor in 1852 and served two terms as alderman.  He was a member of the Michigan House of Representatives from 1847 to 1848.  He was also prosecuting attorney and probate judge of Monroe County.

In 1854, Noble was elected as a Democrat from Michigan's 2nd congressional district to the 33rd United States Congress, serving from March 4, 1853, to March 3, 1855.  He was an unsuccessful candidate for re-election in 1854 to the Thirty-fourth Congress, losing to Republican Henry Waldron in the general election.

In 1858, Noble was appointed manager of the Louisville, New Albany & Chicago Railroad and served four years.  He served as a delegate to the 1864 Democratic National Convention.

David A. Noble died in Monroe, Michigan, and was interred in Woodland Cemetery.  He was the father of Henry Shaw Noble and John Savage Noble.

External links

The Political Graveyard
	

1802 births
1876 deaths
Burials at Woodland Cemetery (Monroe, Michigan)
Democratic Party members of the Michigan House of Representatives
People from Monroe, Michigan
Michigan lawyers
Lawyers from New York City
Democratic Party members of the United States House of Representatives from Michigan
Mayors of places in Michigan
19th-century American politicians
19th-century American lawyers
19th-century American judges
Williams College alumni